Hemicycla modesta is a species of gastropod in the family Helicidae.

Description
The length of the shell attains 16.7 mm.

Distribution
It is endemic to the Canary Islands,  Spain.

References

 Bank, R. A.; Neubert, E. (2017). Checklist of the land and freshwater Gastropoda of Europe. Last update: July 16, 2017.

External links
 Férussac, A.E.J.P.F. d'Audebard de. (1821-1822). Tableaux systématiques des animaux mollusques classés en familles naturelles, dans lesquels on a établi la concordance de tous les systèmes; suivis d'un Prodrome général pour tous les mollusques ou fluviatiles, vivantes ou fossiles. Paris, 1821 et 1822.

Endemic fauna of the Canary Islands
Molluscs of the Canary Islands
Hemicycla
Endemic fauna of Spain
Gastropods described in 1821
Taxonomy articles created by Polbot